The Fly Castelluccio Flash is a family of Italian paramotors that was designed and produced by Fly Castelluccio of Ascoli Piceno for powered paragliding. Now out of production, when it was available the aircraft were supplied complete and ready-to-fly.

Design and development
The  Flash was designed to comply with the US FAR 103 Ultralight Vehicles rules as well as European regulations. It features a paraglider-style wing, single-place accommodation and a single engine in pusher configuration powering a two-bladed wooden propeller.

As is the case with all paramotors, take-off and landing is accomplished by foot. Inflight steering is accomplished via handles that actuate the canopy brakes, creating roll and yaw.

Variants
Flash Top 80
Model with a  Per Il Volo Top 80 engine in pusher configuration with a reverse-turning gear box reduction drive and a  diameter two-bladed wooden propeller.
Flash Sky 100
Model with a Sky 100 engine in pusher configuration with a reduction drive and a  diameter two-bladed wooden propeller.
Flash Snap 100
Model with a Snap 100 engine in pusher configuration with a reduction drive and a  diameter two-bladed wooden propeller.

Specifications (Flash Top 80)

References

External links
 archive

Flash
2000s Italian ultralight aircraft
Single-engined pusher aircraft
Paramotors